Paomet (also called Pamet) was a tribe of Native Americans living near the Pamet River in modern Cape Cod in the 1620s.

See also 
 Native American tribes in Massachusetts

References

Native American tribes in Massachusetts